War, Literature & the Arts is an American literary magazine that publishes stories, poems, essays, reviews, and visuals related to war and military affairs. It was established in 1989 and is based at the United States Air Force Academy in Colorado. The editor-in-chief is Kathleen Harrington.

Awards
Work that has appeared in the magazine has been selected and short-listed for the Pushcart Prize, The Best American Short Stories, and The Best American Essays.

See also
List of literary magazines

Notes

External links

1989 establishments in Colorado
Annual magazines published in the United States
Literary magazines published in the United States
Magazines established in 1989
Magazines published in Colorado
Military magazines published in the United States
United States Air Force Academy
Mass media in Colorado Springs, Colorado